Atombapu Sharma (died 1963) also known as Pandit Raja Atombapu Sharma was a Manipuri Brahmin Sanskrit  scholar, a Vaishnava, also versed in astronomy and astrology, a journalist and social reformer from Manipur, India. He is considered as "The Doyen of Journalism in Manipur".

Works

Atombapu launched the first daily newspaper in Manipur “The Dainik Manipur Patrika” in 1933 and Thongbam Gokulchandra Singh was employed as the editor. He also played an important role in promoting Sankirtana movement in Manipur and authored many books. His other contributions include promotion of journalism, politics, arts and culture and other aspects of Manipur.

He also received the Sangeet Natak Akademi Award for Manipuri dance in 1963.

References

Meitei Brahmins
Brahmins of Manipur
Scholars from Manipur
Dancers from Manipur
Year of birth missing
1963 deaths
Performers of Indian classical dance
Manipuri classical Indian dance exponents
20th-century Indian dancers
Indian male dancers